Olotia is a genus of fungi in the family Psathyrellaceae. The genus is monotypic and contains the single species Olotia codinae which was previously classified as Psathyrella codinae.

Taxonomy 
The Olotia genus was created in 2020 by the German mycologists Dieter Wächter & Andreas Melzer when the Psathyrellaceae family was subdivided based on phylogenetic analysis. Several members of the Psathyrella genus were reclassified and placed in new genera. A single species was placed in Olotia.

The type species, Olotia codinae was previously known as Psathyrella codinae after being classified in 2018 from a discovery in Spain, where it is so far only known from.

Etymology 
The genus is named after the city of Olot in Spain, where the type species was documented.

Psathyrella codinae was named in memory of Catalonian mycologist Joaquim Codina, 150 years after his birth.

Description 
Olotia codinae is a small mushroom with a brown to brownish yellow cap that is 8.5-15mm in diameter. The hollow stem is 17-24mm tall with a thickness of 1.8-2.8mm. The mushroom is described as smelling slightly like radish (raphanoid) but having little noticeable taste.

Species 
Species include:

References 

Psathyrellaceae
Monotypic Agaricales genera
Taxa described in 2020
Fungi of Spain